Philippe Félix Émile Picon (4 October 1874 – 4 December 1922) was a French sailor. He was won the Silver medal  along with Robert Monier and Albert Weil in Sailing at the 1920 Summer Olympics – 6.5 Metre race.

References

External links
 
 
 

1874 births
1922 deaths
French male sailors (sport)
Olympic sailors of France
Olympic silver medalists for France
Olympic medalists in sailing
Medalists at the 1920 Summer Olympics
Sailors at the 1920 Summer Olympics – 6.5 Metre
Sportspeople from Constantine, Algeria